Murat Rural LLG is a local government area in New Ireland Province, Papua New Guinea. The LLG president is Herman Sole. The LLG administers the St. Matthias Group of islands and is located in Kavieng District. Population is 4,210(Census 2011).

Wards
01. Tasitel
02. Magien
03. Loliang
04. Palakau
05. Emira
06. Tench

References

Local-level governments of New Ireland Province